Ergometrinine is an ergot alkaloid.

See also
 Ergometrine

References

Lysergamides